Fujimichō Station (富士見町駅) is the name of two train stations in Japan:

 Fujimichō Station (Kanagawa)
 Fujimichō Station (Tottori)